Forshee-Van Orden House is located in Montvale, Bergen County, New Jersey, United States. The house was built in 1765 and was added to the National Register of Historic Places on July 24, 1984.

See also
National Register of Historic Places listings in Bergen County, New Jersey

References

Houses on the National Register of Historic Places in New Jersey
Houses completed in 1765
Houses in Bergen County, New Jersey
Montvale, New Jersey
National Register of Historic Places in Bergen County, New Jersey
New Jersey Register of Historic Places
1765 establishments in New Jersey